Polytechnic is one of the two sub-systems of higher education of Portugal, the other being a university education. The polytechnic higher education focuses on providing more practical trainings and profession-oriented, while university education has a strong theoretical basis and highly research-oriented. Polytechnic institutions only grant licentiate's and master's degrees, as opposed to universities granting doctor's degrees.
      
Polytechnic education focuses on education, management, technology, health and agriculture programs, although programs in other fields such as arts, sports, journalism, tourism and nautical science can be taught. Polytechnics are the sole providers of higher education programs in some fields like nursery, accounting and kindergarten educators. On the other hand, polytechnics do not have programs in law, medicine, architecture, economics and other subjects which are reserved for the university institutions.

The polytechnics emerged in the 1980s, through the transformation of already existing non-university higher education schools of teachers and agriculture, at the same time that entirely new schools in other fields were also being built. Latter, other higher education schools, like the higher institutes of engineering, the higher institutes of accounting and administration, the higher schools of nursery, nursing schools and the Nautical School were also integrated in the polytechnic education.

Organization
The polytechnic higher education is mostly provided by polytechnic institutes (institutos politécnicos), that can be public or private. The polytechnic institutes are federations of polytechnic schools, each one of these focusing in one or several related subjects areas. These schools are usually named "higher schools" (escolas superiores), although some are named "higher institutes" (institutos superiores). There are also some independent polytechnic schools (not integrated in polytechnic institutes or in other larger institutions) and polytechnic schools that are integrated in universities (despite this, providing polytechnic and not university education).  

There are fifteen public polytechnic institutes in Portugal. Each of these, cover a region of responsibility that usually corresponds to the area of a district. The residents in the regions of have priority in the access to the programs of their respective polytechnics. Also, the programs offered by the polytechnics usually take their respective regions in consideration, focusing in the specific economic, technical and social needs of the local communities. Because of these features, the polytechnic institutes can be compared to the community colleges in the United States.

The polytechnic institutes usually have multiple campus, each one having installed one or more of their schools.

History
There are fifteen state-run polytechnical institutes (the polytechnics) in Portugal and also several other private polytechnic institutions. The designation "Institute of Technology" is not applied at all, being meaningless in Portugal. The polytechnical higher education system provides a more practical training and is profession-oriented, while the university higher education system has a strong theoretical basis and is highly research-oriented. Many major fields of study like medicine, law, the natural sciences, or veterinary, are taught only in university institutions, while other vocationally orientated degrees like nursing, accounting technician, health care technician, socio-cultural animation, administrative assistant, preschool teaching, and technical engineer, are only offered by the polytechnic institutions. Currently, higher education in Portugal is organized into two subsystems: university and polytechnic, with both kind of institutions operating across the country, and since after 2006, with the approval of new legislation and the Bologna Process any polytechnic or university institution of Portugal, is legally able to provide a first cycle of study, known as licenciatura (bachelor's degree) plus a second cycle which confers the mestrado (master's degree). The polytechnic institutions started to offer the first and second cycles after complying with the necessary requirements imposed by the upgrading due to the Bologna process, including a wider budget, proper research activities and a much larger number of doctorates among the teaching staff. Doctorate degrees (3rd cycle degrees) and extensive independent fundamental research work are still exclusive competences of the universities. However, although generally with less resources devoted to investigation than the university institutions, since after the Bologna Process (2006/2007) which allowed the polytechnical institutions to award master's degrees and required the admission of doctorate-level staff, an increasingly large number of Portuguese polytechnical institutions have also established and expanded their own research facilities.

Polytechnic Schools (Escolas Politécnicas) were created in the 19th century in Lisbon (Escola Politécnica) and Porto (Academia Politécnica), and were merged into the newly created universities of Lisbon and Porto in 1911. Other than the name, they were not related at all with the current polytechnic subsystem which exists in Portugal since the 1970s, or to any current institution belonging to them. The current "Polytechnical Institutes" started to open after 1974. Some of them have its origins in the former vocational education "Institutes of Industry and Commerce" (Institutos Industriais e Comerciais) like the ones founded in Lisbon (Instituto Industrial e Comercial de Lisboa), Porto, and Coimbra. A few polytechnical higher education institutions, though formed as such in the 1980s, have their origin in 19th century educational institutions - this is the case of the Instituto Superior de Engenharia de Lisboa, the Instituto Superior de Engenharia do Porto and the Escola Superior Agrária de Coimbra. The polytechnic institutes (institutos politécnicos) of Portugal used to be higher education institutions with very different roles and competences of those encompassed and provided by the universities, because the polytechnics didn't award neither masters nor doctoral degrees, and unlike universities, they didn't develop independent research activities. In the following decades after their start in the 1970s and 1980s, the polytechnic institutions didn't assume their specific role as tertiary education vocational schools, which were created to award practical diplomas in more technical or basic fields. Non-university intermediate professionals and skilled workers for the industry, agriculture, commerce and other services where needed. As more new public university institutions were founded or expanded, polytechnics didn't feel comfortable with their subaltern status in the Portuguese higher education system and a desire to be upgraded into university-like institutions grew among the polytechnic institutions' administrations. This desire of emancipation and evolution from polytechnic status to university status, was not followed by better qualified teaching staff, better facilities for teaching or researching, or by a stronger curricula with a more selective admission criteria, comparable with those enforced by almost all public university institutions. Criteria ambiguity and the general lower standards in polytechnic higher education and admission, were fiercely criticised by education personalities like university rectors, regarding issues like the lack of admission exams in mathematics for polytechnic engineering applicants, and the proliferation of administration and management courses everywhere, many without a proper curriculum in mathematics, statistics and economics-related disciplines. Since 2007, after many reforms, upgrades, and changes, including the Bologna process, the Portuguese polytechnic institutes started to be considered as de facto technical universities in a number of fields, with little formal difference between their 1st and 2nd cycle degrees and those awarded by the classic full chartered universities (polytechnics do not have competences to award 3rd cycle doctorate degrees and, in general, they don't develop fundamental research work). The polytechnical institutes are organized into confederations of autonomous polytechnic higher education units comprising a wide range of fields from engineering or technologies to education to accountancy to agriculture (called institutes and schools). Since the creation of the first polytechnical institutes that started in the late 1970s, to 1999 after new legislation has been approved for these institutions, the polytechnics were only allowed to offer a three-year bachelor degree (bacharelato). In opposition, the Portuguese universities conferred 4 to 6 years major bachelor degrees, known in many countries as licentiate degree (licenciatura). The universities were also the only institutions awarding masters and doctoral degrees in Portugal to graduated people having the licenciatura diploma conferred exclusively in the universities. In general, the polytechnic system has been often regarded as a second choice alternative to the university for a large number of students. There was a historic connotation of the Portuguese polytechnical institutes as the schools of last resort, because of their general low selectiveness (which was clearly substandard from the 1980s to the mid-2000s), lack of historical notability, and diminute number of highly distinguished alumni and professors, which some feel hurts their reputation. However, the changes introduced by the Bologna Process in Portuguese higher education created a more uniform and homogeneous higher educational system, at least in the public university and polytechnical institutions, which within a decade (1997–2007) became more equal, as far as is concerned with the formal attribution of academic degrees.

According to studies and reports, in the 1990s and 2000s, a fast growth and proliferation of private higher education and state-run polytechnical institutions with lower educational standards and ambiguous academic integrity, was responsible for unnecessary and uneconomic allocation of resources with no adequate quality output in terms of both new highly qualified graduates and research. Since the creation of the Portuguese higher education polytechnical system, admission to public university programmes has been often more demanding and selective than to their equivalent in public polytechnics. Many specific university institutions and degrees have also been regarded as more prestigious and reputed than their peers from the polytechnic system.

References

See also 

 Higher Education in Portugal
 List of higher education institutions in Portugal#Polytechnic
 Polytechnic (disambiguation)